Bee is an unincorporated community and census-designated place in Johnston County, Oklahoma, United States. Its population was 140 as of the 2010 census.

History
The community was intended to be named after Dee Taylor, the daughter of two early settlers; however, the U.S. Post Office Department changed the name to "Bee". Its post office operated from April 5, 1889, until June 15, 1918.

Geography

Demographics

References

Unincorporated communities in Johnston County, Oklahoma
Unincorporated communities in Oklahoma
Census-designated places in Johnston County, Oklahoma
Census-designated places in Oklahoma